Treehouse is a game in which players try to get their configuration of Icehouse pieces to match the central configuration, shared by all players.  The rolling of the special "Treehouse Die" tells the player what kind of move to make to change his own or the central configuration, and then he does so to best move towards the goal.  

Treehouse was invented by Andrew Looney in 2006 and is sold by Looney Labs.  It reflects a change in marketing of Icehouse pieces by Looney Labs, in order to try to improve sales and has become the basis for further marketing of the product. It is sold in two color variants: Rainbow (consisting of black (opaque), blue, red, green, yellow) and Xeno (consisting of white (opaque), purple, cyan, orange, clear).

Play

To start, each player is assigned three pyramids, one of each size, stacked on top of one another, in a configuration commonly called a "tree".  Another trio of neutral pyramids (called the "House") is placed in the center of the table, in a different arrangement.  The objective is to arrange your three pyramids to match the house.  However, you are only allowed to maneuver your pyramids as dictated by the roll of a special die.

Reception
The reviewer from the online second volume of Pyramid stated that "Looney Labs is re-launching the Icehouse family with a new game called Treehouse, which is best described as an Icehouse starter set. Available in two different sets -- Xeno and Rainbow -- both consist of a tube containing 15 pyramids divided into five differently colored stacking sets and a Treehouse die marked TIP, SWAP, DIG, AIM, HOP, or WILD. The rules for the game itself are printed on the outside of the tube, which both indicates the simplicity of the game and the ease of reference for the rules."

In 2007, Treehouse won the Origins Award for best boardgame of 2006.

References

External links
Treehouse product page at Looney Labs

Icehouse games
Origins Award winners